The 1985–86 FA Trophy was the seventeenth season of the FA Trophy.

Preliminary round

Ties

Replays

2nd replay

3rd replay

First qualifying round

Ties

Replays

Second qualifying round

Ties

Replays

Third qualifying round

Ties

Replays

1st round

Ties

Replays

2nd round

Ties

Replays

2nd replay

3rd round

Ties

Replays

2nd replay

3rd replay

4th round

Ties

Semi finals

First leg

Second leg

Final

Tie

References

General
 Football Club History Database: FA Trophy 1985-86

Specific

1985–86 domestic association football cups
League
1985-86